The 1988 PBA season was the 14th season of the Philippine Basketball Association (PBA).

Board of governors

Executive committee
 Rodrigo L. Salud (Commissioner) 
 Reynaldo Marquez (Chairman, representing Shell Rimula-X Diesel Oilers)
 Jose C. Ibazeta (Vice-Chairman, representing San Miguel Beermen)
 Wilfred Steven Uytengsu (Treasurer, representing Alaska Milkmen)

Teams

Season highlights
The Tanduay Rhum Makers filed a leave on absence for the 1988 season on January 16, 1988, citing realignment of corporate objectives.  After Tanduay filed a leave, some remnants were absorbed, along with several amateur prospects by Purefoods Corporation, which joined the league after buying a franchise worth P300,000. 
PBA deputy commissioner Rudy Salud became the league's third commissioner. Under Salud's leadership, the PBA soared to greater heights, the Purefoods Hotdogs' entry, along with the never-say-die attitude of the league's most popular team Añejo Rum 65ers, contributed largely to a box-office success in gate attendance.
Amateur standout Alvin Patrimonio, who was a subject of a bitter tug-of-war between the PBA's newest team Purefoods Hotdogs and his mother ballclub in the PABL, corporate rival RFM-Swifts, finally made his PBA debut on June 30.
A blockbuster trade took place before the opening of the Third Conference as veterans Ramon Fernandez of Purefoods, who was bench in the All-Filipino title-series, and Abet Guidaben of San Miguel were traded to each other by their respective ballclubs. 
Ramon Fernandez won his fourth Most Valuable Player trophy as he continued his tradition of winning the prestigious award every two years starting in 1982.

Opening ceremonies
The muses for the participating teams are as follows:

Champions
 Open Conference: San Miguel Beermen
 All-Filipino Conference: Añejo Rum 65
 Reinforced Conference: San Miguel Beermen
 Team with best win–loss percentage: San Miguel Beermen (46–26, .639)
 Best Team of the Year: San Miguel Beermen (1st)

Open Conference

Elimination round

Semifinal round

Third place playoffs 

|}

Finals

|}

Best Import of the Conference: Jamie Waller (Ginebra)

All-Filipino Conference

Elimination round

Semifinal round

Third place playoffs 

|}

Finals 

|}

Reinforced Conference

Elimination round

Semifinal round

Third place playoffs 

|}

Finals

|}
Best Import of the Conference: Bobby Parks (Shell)

Awards
 Most Valuable Player: Ramon Fernandez (Purefoods, San Miguel)
 Rookie of the Year:  Jojo Lastimosa (Purefoods)
 Most Improved Player: Alvin Teng (San Miguel)
 Best Import-Open Conference: Jamie Waller (Ginebra)
 Best Import-Reinforced Conference: Bobby Parks (Shell)
 Mythical Five:
Ricardo Brown (San Miguel)
Hector Calma (San Miguel)
Abet Guidaben (San Miguel, Purefoods)
Ramon Fernandez (Purefoods, San Miguel)
Allan Caidic (Great Taste/Presto)
Mythical Second Team:
Robert Jaworski (Añejo)
Jojo Lastimosa (Purefoods)
Jerry Codiñera (Purefoods)
Elpidio Villamin (Alaska)
Dondon Ampalayo (Añejo)
 All-Defensive Team:
Abe King (Great Taste/Presto)
Philip Cezar (Great Taste/Presto)
Elpidio Villamin (Alaska)
Robert Jaworski (Añejo)
Biboy Ravanes (Alaska)

Cumulative standings

References